The KLM West-Indisch Bedrijf (WIB) or KLM West Indies Company was a subsidiary of KLM, which operated flights within the Dutch West-Indies (Netherlands Antilles and Suriname) and their neighbouring countries.

Its foundation was made possible in part by the ensurance by the Dutch PTT, who offered a lucrative contract for delivering mail to the Dutch Colonies. The first mail flight arriving from the Netherlands to Curaçao by Fokker PH-AIS "Snip" on 22 December 1934 marked the beginning of the company.

Initially, the West-Indisch Bedrijf mainly flew from Willemstad, Curaçao to Aruba (with the first flight occurring on 19 January 1935), Venezuela and Jamaica in cooperation with Koninklijke Nederlandse Stoomboot-Maatschappij (KNSM). Only after  World War II regular flights Amsterdam-Curaçao occurred. World War II itself was of major importance to WIB. Because of the oil refineries on Aruba, WIB became a major transporter and one of the best-run airlines of its day.

In 1964 the West-Indisch Bedrijf was transformed into the Antilliaanse Luchtvaart Maatschappij (ALM), in which the Netherlands Antilles became shareholder.

References

External links
curassow.com

Airlines